Vietnam Airlines Flight 474 crashed on approach to Nha Trang Airport on 14 November 1992 during Cyclone Forrest. The aircraft was a Yakovlev Yak-40 registered VN-A449, a three-engined jet airliner built in the Soviet Union in 1976. One passenger survived, while the other 24 passengers and six crew were killed.

Event
The aircraft was on a domestic scheduled flight from Tan Son Nhat International Airport to Nha Trang Airport. On approach to Nha Trang Airport during bad weather, it descended below a safe altitude and hit trees along a ridge of Ô Kha mountain, crashed, and was destroyed. It took rescuers eight days to find the wreckage of the plane but one passenger had survived.

Sole survivor

Annette Herfkens was the sole survivor of the crash. She survived eight days with multiple injuries and sustained herself only on rainwater. Some passengers survived the initial impact but died before they could be rescued. Herfkens' fiancé, who was travelling with her, died instantly upon impact.

In 2014, Herfkens published the memoir recounting her experiences: Turbulence: A True Story of Survival. It has "...received great applause from [its] audience..." and critical acclaim from Deepak Chopra, Kirkus Reviews and other authors.  

Herfkens writes and speaks about the gains that come with loss. Nine years after the crash her son was diagnosed with autism; she now also works with parents of autistic children. Herfkens lives in New York City with her family. She is the sister of Dutch diplomat, Eveline Herfkens.

Related deaths and aftermath
On 22 November 1992 a Vietnamese Mil Mi-8 helicopter was sent from Hanoi carrying rescue workers for Flight 474, but it crashed near Ô Kha mountain on the same day. All seven people aboard were killed.

Almost a year after the accident, family members in the UK demanded an investigation after receiving news that the bodies were returned to the wrong families.

References

Accidents and incidents involving the Yakovlev Yak-40
Aviation accidents and incidents in 1992
Aviation accidents and incidents in Vietnam
1992 in Vietnam
November 1992 events in Asia